Grand Theft Auto V is a 2013 action-adventure game developed by Rockstar North and published by Rockstar Games. It is the seventh main entry in the Grand Theft Auto series, following 2008's Grand Theft Auto IV, and the fifteenth instalment overall. Set within the fictional state of San Andreas, based on Southern California, the single-player story follows three protagonists—retired bank robber Michael De Santa, street gangster Franklin Clinton, and drug dealer and gunrunner Trevor Philips—and their attempts to commit heists while under pressure from a corrupt government agency and powerful criminals. The open world design lets players freely roam San Andreas' open countryside and the fictional city of Los Santos, based on Los Angeles.

The game is played from either a third-person or first-person perspective, and its world is navigated on foot and by vehicle. Players control the three lead protagonists throughout single-player and switch among them, both during and outside missions. The story is centred on the heist sequences, and many missions involve shooting and driving gameplay. A "wanted" system governs the aggression of law enforcement response to players who commit crimes. Grand Theft Auto Online, the game's online multiplayer mode, lets up to 30 players engage in a variety of different cooperative and competitive game modes.

The game's development began around the time of Grand Theft Auto IV release and was shared between many of Rockstar's studios worldwide. The development team drew influence from many of their previous projects such as Red Dead Redemption and Max Payne 3 and designed the game around three lead protagonists to innovate on the core structure of its predecessors. Much of the development work constituted the open world's creation, and several team members conducted field research around California to capture footage for the design team. The game's soundtrack features an original score composed by a team of producers who collaborated over several years. Grand Theft Auto V was released in September 2013 for the PlayStation 3 and Xbox 360, in November 2014 for the PlayStation 4 and Xbox One, in April 2015 for Windows, and in March 2022 for the PlayStation 5 and Xbox Series X/S.

It received critical acclaim, with praise directed at its multiple protagonist design, open world, presentation and gameplay. However, it caused controversies related to its depiction of violence and women. It won year-end accolades including Game of the Year awards from several gaming publications, and is considered one of seventh and eighth generation console gaming's most significant titles and among the best video games ever made. Its successor is in development.

Gameplay 
Grand Theft Auto V is an action-adventure game played from either a third-person or first-person perspective. Players complete missions—linear scenarios with set objectives—to progress through the story. Outside of the missions, players may freely roam the open world. Composed of the San Andreas open countryside area, including the fictional Blaine County, and the fictional city of Los Santos, the world is much larger in area than earlier entries in the series. It may be fully explored after the game's beginning without restriction, although story progress unlocks more gameplay content.

Players use melee attacks, firearms and explosives to fight enemies, and may run, jump, swim or use vehicles to navigate the world. To accommodate the map's size, the game introduces vehicle types absent in its predecessor Grand Theft Auto IV, such as fixed-wing aircraft. In combat, auto-aim and a cover system may be used as assistance against enemies. Should players take damage, their health meter will gradually regenerate to its halfway point. Players respawn at hospitals when their health depletes. If players commit crimes, law enforcement agencies may respond as indicated by a "wanted" meter in the head-up display (HUD). Stars displayed on the meter indicate the current wanted level (for example, at the maximum five-star level, police helicopters and SWAT teams swarm to lethally dispatch players). Law enforcement officers will search for players who leave the wanted vicinity. The meter enters a cool-down mode and eventually recedes when players are hidden from the officers' line of sight that displays on the mini-map for a period of time.

The single-player mode lets players control three characters: Michael De Santa, Trevor Philips and Franklin Clinton—criminals whose stories interconnect as they complete missions. Some missions are completed with only one character and others feature two or three. Outside the missions, players may switch between characters at will by a directional compass on the HUD, although this feature becomes restricted at various points throughout the story. The game may switch characters automatically during missions to complete specific objectives. A character's compass avatar will flash red if he is in danger and needs help, and flash white if he has a strategic advantage. Though players complete missions as any of the three protagonists, the more difficult heist missions require aid from AI-controlled accomplices with unique skill sets like computer hacking and driving. If an accomplice survives a successful heist, they take a cut from the cash reward and may be available for later missions with improvements to their unique skills. Some heists afford multiple strategies; in a holdup mission, players may either stealthily subdue civilians with an incapacitating agent or conspicuously storm the venue with guns drawn.

Each character has a set of eight skills that represent their ability in specific areas such as shooting and driving. Though skills improve through play, each character has a skill with expertise by default (e.g. Trevor's flying skill). The eighth "special" skill determines the effectiveness in performing an ability that is unique to each respective character. Michael enters bullet time in combat, Franklin slows down time while driving, and Trevor deals twice as much damage to enemies while taking half as much in combat. A meter on each character's HUD depletes when an ability is being used and regenerates when players perform skilful actions (for example, drifting in vehicles as Franklin or performing headshots as Michael).

While free-roaming the game world, players may engage in context-specific activities such as scuba diving and BASE jumping, and visit businesses such as cinemas and strip clubs. Each character has a smartphone for contacting friends, starting activities and accessing an in-game Internet. The Internet lets players trade in stocks via a stock market. Players may purchase properties such as garages and businesses, upgrade the weapons and vehicles in each character's arsenal, and customise their appearance by purchasing outfits, haircuts and tattoos.

Plot
In 2004,{{efn|The game's prologue is set nine years before the main storyline, which takes place in 2013.<ref>{{cite video game | title = Grand Theft Auto V | developer = Rockstar North | publisher = Rockstar Games | date = 17 September 2013 | platform = PlayStation 3, Xbox 360 | quote = Mission: "The Paleto Score"Trevor: "Mikey, bro, what was your first bank score?"Michael: "Eighty-eight, outskirts of Carcer City. Took a small franchise for ten G. Things were easier back then."Trevor: "Twenty-five years ago. Jesus."'}}</ref>}} Michael Townley, Trevor Philips, and Brad Snider partake in a failed robbery in Ludendorff, North Yankton, resulting in Michael being presumed dead. Nine years later, Michael lives with his family in the city of Los Santos under the alias Michael De Santa, having made a secret agreement with the Federal Investigation Bureau (FIB) agent Dave Norton to stay hidden. Across town, gangster Franklin Clinton works for a corrupt car salesman and meets Michael while attempting to fraudulently repossess his son's car. The two later become friends. When Michael finds his wife sleeping with her tennis coach, he and Franklin chase the coach to a mansion, which Michael destroys in anger. The owner of the mansion, drug lord Martin Madrazo, demands compensation. Michael returns to a life of crime to obtain the money, enlisting Franklin as an accomplice. With the help of Michael's old friend Lester Crest, a disabled hacker, they rob a jewellery store to pay off the debt. Meanwhile, Trevor, who lives in squalor on the outskirts of Los Santos, hears of the heist and realises it was Michael's work; Trevor had believed the FIB killed Michael in the Ludendorff heist. Trevor finds Michael and reunites with him, forcing Michael to reluctantly accept him back into his life.

As time goes on, the protagonists' lives spiral out of control. Michael's criminal behaviour prompts his family to leave him. When he later becomes a movie producer, he comes into conflict with Devin Weston, a billionaire venture capitalist and corporate raider, who attempts to shut down Michael's studio. Michael thwarts his efforts and inadvertently kills his assistant, causing Devin to vow revenge. Meanwhile, Franklin must rescue his friend Lamar Davis from their former friend and rival gangster Harold "Stretch" Joseph, who attempts to kill them to prove himself to his new gang. Concurrently, Trevor tries to consolidate his control over various black markets in Blaine County, waging war against The Lost outlaw motorcycle club, Latin American street gangs, rival meth dealers, private military company Merryweather, and triad kingpin Wei Cheng.

Having broken his agreement with Dave by committing heists again, Michael is coerced by Dave and his superior, Steve Haines, to perform a series of operations alongside Franklin and Trevor to undermine the International Affairs Agency (IAA). Under Steve's direction and with Lester's help, they attack a convoy carrying funds for the IAA and steal an experimental chemical weapon from an IAA lab. As Steve comes under increasing scrutiny, he forces Michael and Franklin to erase evidence against him from the FIB servers. Michael takes the opportunity to wipe the data on his activities, destroying Steve's leverage over him.

After reconciling with his family, Michael starts planning his final heist with Trevor, Franklin, and Lester: raiding the Union Depository's gold bullion reserve. However, Trevor discovers that Brad was not imprisoned as he was led to believe, but killed during the Ludendorff heist and buried in the grave marked for Michael. Deducing that the heist was a setup and that he was supposed to be killed in Brad's place, Trevor feels betrayed and leaves Michael for dead following a standoff with Cheng's henchmen. Although Franklin rescues Michael, Trevor's anger towards the latter causes friction within the group and threatens to undermine their plans. Meanwhile, Steve betrays Michael and Dave, and they become caught in a Mexican standoff between the FIB, the IAA, and Merryweather. Michael and Dave are rescued by Trevor, who decided to partake in the Union Depository heist and part ways with Michael afterwards.

The heist is successful, but Franklin is afterwards approached by Steve and Dave, who contend that Trevor is a liability, and Devin, who seeks revenge on Michael. Franklin has three options: kill Trevor, kill Michael, or attempt to save both in a suicide mission. Should Franklin choose to kill either Michael or Trevor, he ceases contact with the man he spares and returns to his old life. Otherwise, the trio, aided by Lamar and Lester, withstands an onslaught from the FIB and Merryweather before going on to kill Cheng, Stretch, Steve, and Devin. Michael and Trevor reconcile, and the three protagonists cease working together but remain friends.

Development

Rockstar North began to develop Grand Theft Auto V in 2008, around Grand Theft Auto IV release. Development was conducted by a team of more than 1,000 people, including Rockstar North's core team and staff from parent company Rockstar Games' studios around the world. The proprietary Rockstar Advanced Game Engine (RAGE) was overhauled for the game to improve its draw distance rendering capabilities. The Euphoria and Bullet software handle additional animation and rendering tasks. Having become familiar with the PlayStation 3 and Xbox 360 hardware over time, Rockstar found they were able to push the consoles' graphical capabilities further than in previous games.

The open world was modelled on Southern California and Los Angeles, and its design and in-game render constituted much of the game's early work. Key members of the game world production team took field research trips throughout the region and documented their research with photo and video footage. Google Maps projections of Los Angeles were used by the team to help design Los Santos' road networks. To reflect and reproduce Los Angeles' demographic spread, the developers studied census data and watched documentaries about the city. The team considered creating the open world the most technically demanding aspect of the game's production.

A fundamental design goal from the outset was to innovate on the series' core structure by giving players control of three lead protagonists instead of one. The idea was first raised during Grand Theft Auto: San Andreas development, but contemporaneous hardware restrictions made it infeasible. Having developed two Grand Theft Auto IV episodic expansion packs featuring new protagonists in 2009, the team wanted to base Grand Theft Auto V around three simultaneously controlled protagonists. The team viewed it as a spiritual successor to many of their previous games (such as Grand Theft Auto IV, Red Dead Redemption and Max Payne 3, and designed it to improve upon their gameplay mechanics. They sought to improve the action gameplay by refining the shooting mechanics and cover system and reworked the driving mechanics to correct Grand Theft Auto IV awkward vehicle controls.

After an audition process, Ned Luke, Shawn Fonteno and Steven Ogg were selected to portray Michael, Franklin and Trevor, respectively. Their performances were mostly recorded using motion capture technology, but dialogue for scenes with characters seated in vehicles was recorded in studios instead. The game features an original score composed by a team of producers collaborating over several years. Licensed music provided by an in-game radio is also used. The team licensed more than 241 tracks shared between fifteen radio stations, with an additional two stations providing talk radio. Some of the tracks were written specifically for the game, such as rapper and producer Flying Lotus' original work composed for the FlyLo FM radio station he hosts.

 Release 
The game was first announced by Rockstar Games on 25 October 2011. They released its debut trailer one week later, with an official press release acknowledging its setting. Journalists noted that the announcement ignited widespread anticipation within the gaming industry, which they owed to the cultural significance of the series. The game missed its original projected Q2 2013 release date, pushed back to 17 September to allow for further polishing. To spur pre-order game sales, Rockstar collaborated with several retail outlets to make a special edition with extra in-game features. They ran a viral marketing strategy with a website for a fictional religious cult, "The Epsilon Program", that offered users the chance to feature in the game as members of the cult.

A re-release of the game was announced for PlayStation 4, Windows, and Xbox One at E3 2014. This enhanced version features an increased draw distance, finer texture details, denser traffic, upgraded weather effects, and new wildlife and vegetation. It includes a new on-foot first-person view option, which required the development team to overhaul the animation system to accommodate first-person gameplay. The PlayStation 4 and Xbox One versions were released on 18 November 2014. The PC version, initially scheduled for simultaneous release with the console versions, was delayed until 14 April 2015. According to Rockstar, it required extra development time for "polish". The PC version is capable of 60 frames per second gameplay at 4K resolution, and the Rockstar Editor lets players capture and edit gameplay videos. Plans to develop single-player downloadable content were later scrapped as the team focused resources on Grand Theft Auto Online and Red Dead Redemption 2.

A new version, commonly referred to as "Expanded & Enhanced", was announced in June 2020. Released on 15 March 2022 for PlayStation 5 and Xbox Series X/S, it features technical enhancements and performance updates. A trailer released for the new version in September 2021 was met with negativity, becoming one of the most-disliked videos on PlayStation's YouTube channel; journalists noted that fans were frustrated by Rockstar's continued focus on the game instead of other projects such as a new Grand Theft Auto game, as well as the lack of apparent new features demonstrated in the trailer.

Grand Theft Auto Online

Developed in tandem with the single-player mode, the online multiplayer mode Grand Theft Auto Online was conceived as a separate experience to be played in a continually evolving world. Up to 30 players freely roam across the game world and enter lobbies to complete jobs (story-driven competitive and cooperative modes). The Content Creator toolset lets players create their own parameters for custom jobs, like racetracks and deathmatch weapon spawn points. Players may band together in organised player teams called crews to complete jobs together. Rockstar Games Social Club extends crews formed in Max Payne 3 multiplayer mode to those of Grand Theft Auto Online. Players may create their own crews and join up to five total. Crews win multiplayer matches to earn experience points and climb online leaderboards.Grand Theft Auto Online launched on 1 October 2013, two weeks after Grand Theft Auto V release. Many players reported connection difficulties and game freezes during load screens. Rockstar released a technical patch on 5 October in an effort to resolve the issues, but problems persisted the second week following launch as some players reported their character progress as having disappeared. Another technical patch was released on 10 October combating the issues, and Rockstar offered a GTA$500,000 (in-game currency) stimulus to the accounts of all players connected to Online since launch as recompense. Because of the widespread technical issues present at launch, many reviewers bemoaned their Grand Theft Auto Online experience but generally recognised its open-ended exploration and dynamic content as strengths.

Post-release content is continually added to Grand Theft Auto Online through free title updates. Some updates add new game modes and features, and others feature themed gameplay content, such as the Independence Day Special update that added patriotic-themed content on 1 July 2014. The widely anticipated Online Heists update launched on 10 March 2015 and suffered some initial technical difficulties due to the increased user load. Shortly after the game's PC release, some players reported being banned from Grand Theft Auto Online for using field of view and cosmetic mods in single-player. Rockstar stated in their official blog that nobody had been banned from Online for using single-player mods, but that recent updates to the PC version had the "unintentional effect" of making such mods unplayable. They stated that mods are unauthorised and may cause unforeseen technical problems and instabilities.

Reception
Initial releaseGrand Theft Auto V received "universal acclaim" from critics, according to review aggregator Metacritic, based on 50 reviews for the PlayStation 3 version and 58 reviews for the Xbox 360 version. The game is Metacritic's fifth-highest rated, tied with several others. Reviewers liked the multiple lead character formula, heist mission design and presentation, but some did not agree on the quality of the story and characters. IGN Keza MacDonald called Grand Theft Auto V "one of the very best video games ever made", and Play considered it "generation-defining" and "exceptional". Edge wrote that it is a "remarkable achievement" in open-world design and storytelling, while The Daily Telegraph Tom Hoggins declared it a "colossal feat of technical engineering". It became the second-ever western developed game to be awarded a perfect score from the Japanese video game magazine Famitsu.

CNET's Jeff Bakalar felt that the game encouraged players to engage with all three characters. Edge found that switching players helped avoid long travel times to mission start points. Because of the switching mechanic, Game Informer Matt Bertz noted that players are kept "in the thick of the action" during shootouts. Eurogamer Tom Bramwell wrote that switching added a tactical element to shootouts as characters set up in strategic outposts would cause fewer "shooting gallery" situations than previous instalments. IGN MacDonald felt the switching feature gave players more choice in their approach and made missions less predictable.Giant Bomb Jeff Gerstmann considered the heist missions a welcome deviation from series typical mission structure. Eurogamer Bramwell likened them to "blockbuster set-pieces", and GameSpot Carolyn Petit cited the 1995 film Heat as a stylistic influence on their design. Joystiq Xav de Matos felt creativity and methodical approaches were encouraged. Polygon Chris Plante likened rapid character switching during heist missions to "film editing, with the player serving as editor, switching rapidly to the most interesting perspective for any moment". Computer and Video Games Andy Kelly felt that overall mission design was more diverse than and lacked the escort errands of its predecessors.Edge praised the game's graphical fidelity and absence of load screens. Play complimented the draw distances and weather and lighting systems. Eurogamer Bramwell considered the lighting system to be the game's most significant advancement. Official Xbox Magazine (OXM's Mikel Reparaz thought that the game was "probably the Xbox 360's greatest technical achievement", and was surprised that the open world could render on the console. Reviewers lauded the open-world design, some further complimenting the game for streamlining Los Angeles' geography into a well-designed city space. GameTrailers Brandon Jones considered the Los Angeles emulation authentic and the open world "full of voice and personality". IGN and PlayStation Official Magazine (OPM made favourable comparisons between Los Santos and Grand Theft Auto IV Liberty City. OXM Reparez felt Los Santos surpassed the "grey and gritty" Liberty City. Reviewers praised the world's satire of contemporary American culture—OPM Joel Gregory opined that "the scathing social commentary is, of course, present and correct".Destructoid Jim Sterling called the sound design "impeccable" and praised the actors' performances, original soundtrack and licensed music use. IGN and Giant Bomb commended the music selection and felt that the original score enhanced dramatic tension during missions. GameSpot Petit wrote that the score "lends missions more cinematic flavour". Edge said that the licensed music enhanced the city's "already remarkable sense of space" and that the original score improved the atmosphere of the gameplay. They summarised the game as "a compendium of everything Rockstar has learnt about the power of game music in the past decade".

Many reviewers found the land-based vehicles more responsive and easier to control than in previous games. Game Informer Bertz explained that "cars have a proper sense of weight, while retaining the agility necessary for navigating through traffic at high speeds". In addition to the vehicle handling, most reviewers noted the shooting mechanics were tighter than they had been in previous games, but Destructoid Sterling felt that in spite of the improvements, auto-aim was "twitchy and unreliable" and cover mechanics "still come off as dated and unwieldy". Some reviewers felt the game solved a persistent problem by adding mid-mission checkpoints.

The story and characters—particularly Trevor—polarised reviewers. Some felt that the narrative was not as well written as previous Rockstar games and cited Grand Theft Auto IV and Red Dead Redemption plot strengths. Others thought that the protagonists' contrasting personalities gave the narrative tighter pacing. GamesRadar Hollander Cooper thought the game negated inconsistencies in the story of previous entries, whose single lead protagonists had muddled morality. GameSpot Petit considered Trevor, in particular, a "truly horrible, terrifying, psychotic human being—and a terrific character". Eurogamer Bramwell found Trevor "shallow and unconvincing", and felt that his eccentricities hurt the narrative and overshadowed Michael and Franklin's character development. Joystiq de Matos faulted the protagonists' lack of likability for him, and found the ambivalence between Michael and Trevor a tired plot device as their conflict grew into a "seemingly endless cycle". The Escapist Greg Tito had difficulty connecting with the characters' emotions since they acted out of greed with no sense of morality and thus gave players little reason to support them.

Re-releaseGrand Theft Auto V re-release, similarly, received critical acclaim. It is the highest-rated PlayStation 4 and Xbox One game on Metacritic alongside Rockstar's Red Dead Redemption 2, and the second-highest rated PC game alongside several others.Game Informer Andrew Reiner considered the addition of first-person "another significant breakthrough for the series" in the vein of Grand Theft Auto III shift to third-person from Grand Theft Auto bird's-eye view. GameSpot Mark Walton found that playing in first-person heightened the impact of Grand Theft Auto V violence, which made him reflect on morality and character motivation more than before. VideoGamer.com opined that players feel like inhabitants of the world, rather than "guns attached to a floating camera". IGN Dan Stapleton found the game more immersive in first-person, creating a "surprisingly different experience". VideoGamer.com praised the "finer details" in first-person animations like camera lean when players take corners on motorcycles, or the navigational instruments in plane cockpits. Reviewers found playing the game more difficult in first-person, but Game Informer Reiner preferred the challenge.GameSpot Walton thought the graphics improvements made the open world "even more spectacular", especially because of improved spatial anti-aliasing. Of the first-person view, he said that "at ground level everything looks bigger and more imposing" because of the improved graphics. IGN Stapleton favoured the PlayStation 4 version's graphics over the Xbox One but thought both consoles rendered the game well and maintained mostly consistent frame rates. He praised the increased frame rate and graphics options offered in the PC version. VideoGamer.com called the console version's frame rate so consistent it was "scarcely believable", although GameSpot Walton cited occasional frame rate dips. GameSpot Peter Brown opined that the PC version let players "witness the full extent of Rockstar's admirable handiwork", but noted that it "retains evidence of its last-gen roots ... with simple geometry". VideoGamer.com praised the Rockstar Editor's accessibility on PC but criticised some of its limitations, such as camera angle restrictions. IGN Stapleton appreciated the PC version's customisable controls, and GameSpot Brown felt that constant switching between the mouse and keyboard and a gamepad was necessary for "the best experience". PC Gamer Chris Thursten called the game "the most beautiful, expansive and generous" of the series.

On the game's multiplayer, IGN Stapleton reported low player counts in matches, long wait times in lobbies, server disconnection and occasional crashes. "Because of that," he wrote, "I can't strongly recommend ... the multiplayer experience alone". VideoGamer.com found online character progression streamlined by comparison with the original version. According to them, the "grind of just doing PvP until co-op Jobs arrive with regularity" was lost, and newcomers would likely find multiplayer enjoyable and balanced. However, they wrote of frequent server disconnection, especially during load screens. GameSpot Walton thought that Grand Theft Auto Online "still suffers from a lack of direction" for its open-ended and frenetic gameplay, but still is fun. Game Informer Reiner reported "minimal lag or issues in the expanded firefights and races".

The PlayStation 5 and Xbox Series releases received tepid responses from critics, who questioned the value proposition of a new version of the ageing title. While the improved visual fidelity was singled out for praise, reviewers generally found the core gameplay, storytelling and character models dated. Hardcore Gamers Chris Shive thought the lack of new content made the upgrade difficult to recommend to PlayStation 4 and Xbox One players. GamingBolts Shubhankar Parijat was apathetic towards the visual enhancements but praised the increased accessibility for Online newcomers. Jeuxvideo.coms Nicolas Dixmier thought the release offered the supreme console experience and highlighted the improved graphics and load times. Push Squares Sammy Barker faulted the antiquated humour but thought the visual and technical enhancements gave the "sunny sandbox a new lease of life".

AwardsGrand Theft Auto V received multiple nominations and awards from gaming publications. Before release, it won Most Anticipated Game at the 2012 Spike Video Game Awards. The game was review aggregators Metacritic and GameRankings' highest-rated for the year 2013. The game appeared on several year-end lists of 2013's best games, receiving Game of the Year wins from independent journalist Tom Chick, CNET, Edge, the 31st Golden Joystick Awards, the 5th Annual Inside Gaming Awards, the Spike VGX 2013 Awards, Slant Magazine and Time. It was named the Best Xbox Game by Canada.com, GameSpot, and IGN, and the Best Multiplatform Game by Destructoid. Rockstar Games and Rockstar North won Best Studio and Best Developer from Edge, and the BAFTA Academy Fellowship Award at the 10th British Academy Video Games Awards.

Various in-game elements were recognised with awards. Trevor was named Best Character for the Official Xbox Magazine Game of the Year Awards 2013, while Lamar Davis won the Best New Character award from Giant Bomb. The music received awards from Spike VGX, Hardcore Gamer and The Daily Telegraph. Grand Theft Auto Online won Best Multiplayer from GameTrailers and BAFTA, and Best Xbox 360 Multiplayer from IGN. Online was also nominated for Biggest Disappointment by Game Revolution and Hardcore Gamer. Grand Theft Auto V won Best Technical Achievement in the Telegraph Video Game Awards, and Best Technology at the 14th Annual Game Developers Choice Awards. The graphical and artistic design received awards from IGN, The Daily Telegraph and BAFTA, and a nomination at the Game Developers Choice Awards.

The game received numerous other awards. It was awarded the title of Most Immersive Game at the Inside Gaming Awards. The general public voted for the game to win the User Choice Award at the PlayStation Awards 2013 and the Community Choice award from Destructoid. The game received the Platinum Award at the PlayStation Awards and was named the Best British Game from BAFTA. At IGN Best of 2013 Awards, it earned multiple wins, including Best Xbox 360 Graphics, Best Xbox 360 Sound, and Best Action Game on Xbox 360, PlayStation 3 and overall.

Controversies

The game has generated several controversies related to its violence and depiction of women. The mission "By the Book", which requires players to use torture equipment in a hostage interrogation polarised reviewers, who noted its political commentary but felt that the torture sequence was in poor taste. The mission also received criticism from politicians and anti-torture charity groups. The game became subject to widespread online debate over its portrayal of women, particularly in the wake of the backlash against GameSpot journalist Carolyn Petit when she claimed the game was misogynistic in her review. After Petit's review webpage received more than 20,000 mostly negative comments, many journalists defended her right to an opinion and lamented the gaming community's defensiveness towards criticism. Television personality Karen Gravano and actress Lindsay Lohan both filed lawsuits against Rockstar in allegation that characters in the game were based on their likenesses. Their lawsuits were later dismissed. Australian department store Target pulled the game from their 300 stores following a Change.org petition against depictions of violence towards women in the game.

Sales
The numbers nearly doubled analysts' expectations for the title. Three days after its release, the game had surpassed one billion dollars in sales, making it the fastest-selling entertainment product in history. Six weeks after its release, Rockstar had shipped nearly 29 million copies of the game to retailers, exceeding the lifetime figures of Grand Theft Auto IV. On 7 October 2013, the game became the best-selling digital release on PlayStation Store for PlayStation 3, breaking the previous record set by The Last of Us, though numerical sales figures were not disclosed. It broke seven Guinness World Records on 8 October: best-selling video game in 24 hours, best-selling action-adventure video game in 24 hours, highest-grossing video game in 24 hours, fastest entertainment property to gross , fastest video game to gross , highest revenue generated by an entertainment product in 24 hours, and most viewed trailer for an action-adventure video game. A digital version was released on 18 October for the Xbox 360, which went on to become the highest-grossing day-one and week-one release on Xbox Live. As of August 2014, the game has sold-in over 34 million units to retailers for the PlayStation 3 and Xbox 360. By December 2014, the game had shipped 45 million copies, including 10 million copies of the re-released version. As of December 2022, the game has shipped over 175 million copies worldwide across all platforms; more copies were sold in 2020 than any other year since the game's launch in 2013.

In the United Kingdom, the game became the all-time fastest-selling game, selling more than 2.25 million copies in five days. This broke the record set by Call of Duty: Black Ops at two million copies over the same period. It broke the day one record by selling 1.57 million copies and generating £65 million. In two weeks, the game sold more than 2.6 million copies and generated £90 million, which accounted for 52% of games sold in September 2013. After three weeks on sale, it beat Grand Theft Auto IV lifetime sales in the United Kingdom. In its fourth week, it became the fastest-selling title to break the three million barrier in the UK, thus overtaking Black Ops II lifetime sales. In November 2014, the game became the best-selling game of all time in the UK, overtaking Black Ops. The game was similarly successful in North America: it was the best selling game in September, representing over 50% of software sales and boosting overall software sales by 52% compared to September 2012.

Legacy
Critics agreed that Grand Theft Auto V was among seventh-generation console gaming's best and a great closing title before the eighth generation's emergence. Polygon Plante observed that the game would "bridge between games' present and the future", and declared it "the closure of this generation, and the benchmark for the next". VideoGamer.com's Simon Miller considered it "the ultimate swansong for this console cycle" that would "cast a long shadow over the next". Three days after its release, the game ranked second on IGN's "Top 25 Xbox 360 Games" list. Editor Ryan McCaffrey considered that the open world's scale and detail succeeded the majority of other Xbox 360 games. He called the game "a triumph both for gamers and for the medium itself, and it deserves its runaway success". In November 2013, Hardcore Gamer placed the game third on their "Top 100 Games of the Generation" list. They cited its improved shooting and driving mechanics over its predecessors, and considered the multiple protagonist design "a welcome change of pace" that could become an eighth-generation gaming benchmark. In December, The Daily Telegraph listed the game among their "50 best games of the console generation". They called it a "cultural behemoth" that "will be Rockstar's lasting legacy".

In January 2014, Computer and Video Games ranked the game fourth on their "Games of the Generation" list. Editor Rob Crossley said that for the first time, Rockstar created an "utterly beautiful" open world. He found that the game did away with Grand Theft Auto IV repetitive mission design and focused instead on fun gameplay. In May, IGN ranked it eighth on their "Top 100 Games of a Generation" list and called it a "huge, raucous, and wildly ambitious bridge towards the [eighth] generation of console gaming". The next month, it placed third on IGN's "Games of a Generation: Your Top 100" list as voted by the site's readers. In August, Game Informer ranked it third on their "Top 10 Action Games Of The Generation" list. They compared the game's quality to that of its predecessor but thought that its ensemble character set-up, varied missions and multiplayer superseded Grand Theft Auto IV placement on the list. They wrote of the story's absurd drama and the open world's vastness, and did not "regret a single second" spent playing the game. In November, Edge named it the fifth-best game of its generation and commented that "no other game studio is even daring to attempt an open world game in its tradition because there is simply no possibility of measuring up to [its] standards." In 2015, the publication rated it the second greatest video game of all time. The game ranked high on several best game lists determined by the public; it featured eighth on Empire "100 Greatest Video Games Of All Time" list, and fifth on Good Game'' "Top 100 Games" list, as voted by the magazine and programme's respective audiences. It was the most tweeted game of 2015, despite being released over a year earlier.

Development of the as-yet untitled next main entry in the series was confirmed by Rockstar in February 2022.

Use in research
In 2022, researchers at Brigham Young University and UBC Sauder School of Business conducted a decision-making study in partnership with the developers of LSPDFR, a modification for the game which allows players to take on the role of a police officer, with the goal of studying how players behave in law enforcement situations. The study included a survey and optional data collection of players while using the modification. The study has since closed and results are being analyzed.

The game was also used in a study by Intel Labs where they presented an approach for enhancing the game's graphics using neural networks.

Notes

References

Bibliography

External links 

 

 
2013 video games
Action-adventure games
Bank robbery in fiction
British Academy Games Award for British Game winners
British Academy Games Award for Game Design winners
British Academy Games Award for Multiplayer winners
First-person shooters
The Game Awards winners
Golden Joystick Award for Game of the Year winners
V
Interactive Achievement Award winners
Multiplayer and single-player video games
Obscenity controversies in video games
Open-world video games
Organized crime video games
PlayStation 3 games
PlayStation 4 games
PlayStation 5 games
Rockstar Advanced Game Engine games
Rockstar Games games
Spike Video Game Awards Game of the Year winners
Take-Two Interactive games
Third-person shooters
Triad (organized crime)
Video games developed in the United Kingdom
Video games featuring black protagonists
Video games produced by Dan Houser
Video games produced by Leslie Benzies
Video games scored by Woody Jackson
Video games set in 2004
Video games set in 2013
Video games set in the United States
Video games with alternate endings
Video games with custom soundtrack support
Video games with downloadable content
Video games with time manipulation
Video games with user-generated gameplay content
Video games written by Dan Houser
Windows games
Xbox 360 games
Xbox One games
Xbox Series X and Series S games